Bryan Federico Bautista López (born 29 January 1997) is a Uruguayan footballer who plays as a midfielder for Rampla Juniors  in the Uruguayan Segunda División on loan from Rentistas.

Career

Rentistas
A product of the club's youth academy, Bautista made his league debut for the club on 17 September 2016, coming on as an 80th minute substitute for Richard Dorrego in a 1-1 draw with Cerro Largo.

References

External links

1997 births
Living people
C.A. Rentistas players
C.A. Bella Vista players
Rampla Juniors players
Uruguayan Primera División players
Uruguayan Segunda División players
Uruguayan footballers
Association football midfielders